Alison Ruth M. Norrish (born 19 December 1968) is a retired British rowing coxswain. Norrish competed in the women's coxed four event at the 1988 Summer Olympics. She represented England and won a silver medal in the eight and a bronze medal in the coxed four at the 1986 Commonwealth Games in Edinburgh, Scotland. She was a member of the eight that won the national title rowing for a A.R.A squad at the 1987 National Championships.

References

External links
 
 

1968 births
Living people
British female rowers
Olympic rowers of Great Britain
Rowers at the 1988 Summer Olympics
Commonwealth Games medallists in rowing
Commonwealth Games silver medallists for England
Commonwealth Games bronze medallists for England
Rowers at the 1986 Commonwealth Games
Coxswains (rowing)
Medallists at the 1986 Commonwealth Games